Money Lo Man Yee (盧敏儀, born 19 November 1960) is a Hong Kong actress.

Filmography
 Web of Deception (1997) - Candy
 Mr. Mumble (1996) - Mistress of Ceremonies
 100 Ways to Kill Yourself (1996) - Cardin
 On Fire (1996)
 Banana Club (1996)
 Infatuation (1995)
 O.C.T.B. Case: The Floating Body (1995) - Yin Li
 Brother of Darkness (1994)
 Red to Kill (1994) (as Man Yee Lo) - Ka Lok Cheung
 All's Well, Ends Well Too (1993) - Snow White's Servant
 Remains of a Woman (1993) - Television Reporter in Green
 Daughter of Darkness (1993) - Dong Huan
 Path of Glory (1989)
 Mr. Fortune (1989)
 Police Story (1985) - Television Interviewer
 "Joi geen sup gao sui" (1983) TV Series

External links

 hkcinemagic entry
 brns entry (contains 2 pictures)

Hong Kong film actresses
Living people
20th-century Hong Kong actresses
Hong Kong television actresses
1960 births